Sajasan is a mountain in the counties of Jangheung and Boseong,  Gangwon-do, in South Korean.

See also
 List of mountains in Korea

Notes

References
 

Mountains of South Korea
Mountains of Gangwon Province, South Korea